Edward Field may refer to:

Edward Field (poet) (born 1924), American poet and author
Edward Field (Royal Navy officer) (1828–1912), Royal Navy officer and English politician
Edward Salisbury Field (1878–1936), American author, playwright, artist, poet, and journalist